Raino Pesu (born 15 October 1972 in Joutseno) is a Finnish ski-orienteering competitor, world champion and  winner of the overall world cup.

He received a gold medal in the short course at the 1998 World Ski Orienteering Championships in Windischgarsten.

He finished overall first in the World Cup in Ski Orienteering in 1999, and second in 1995.

See also
 Finnish orienteers
 List of orienteers
 List of orienteering events

References

1972 births
Living people
People from Lappeenranta
Finnish orienteers
Male orienteers
Ski-orienteers
Sportspeople from South Karelia